Niceforo's big-eared bat (Trinycteris nicefori) is a bat species from South and Central America, ranging from Chiapas to Bolivia and northeastern Brazil. Its habitat is primary and secondary forest at altitudes from sea level to 1000 m. It is crepuscular, being most active in the hour after sunset and before dawn. The species is monotypic within its genus.

Description
It is a small species with triangular ears.
Its fur is grayish-brown. Most individuals have a faint, pale-colored stripe that runs down their back along the spine.

Biology and ecology
It is nocturnal, roosting in sheltered places during the day such as hollow logs and human structures.

Range and habitat
It is found in Belize, Bolivia, Brazil, Colombia Costa Rica, Ecuador, French Guiana, Guatemala, Guyana, Mexico, Nicaragua, Panama, Peru, Suriname, Trinidad and Tobago, and Venezuela.

Conservation
As of 2015, it is classified as a least-concern species by the IUCN.

References

Phyllostomidae
Bats of Central America
Bats of South America
Bats of Brazil
Bats of Mexico
Mammals of Colombia
Mammals described in 1949
Taxa named by Colin Campbell Sanborn